Carole Tongue, FRSA (born 14 October 1955) is a former Member of the European Parliament for London East (from 1984 to 1999) and Deputy Leader of the European Parliamentary Labour Party (from 1989 to 1991). She was an unsuccessful candidate for Change UK at the 2019 European Parliament election in London.

Early life
Tongue was educated at Brentwood County High School and Loughborough University. She worked as an administrative assistant, then for the secretariat of the Socialist Group, also spending time as an editor, a courier and a guide.

Responsibilities in the European Parliament
In the European Parliament, as a member of the Economic and Monetary Committee (1989–1994), she wrote two reports, overwhelmingly adopted, on the future of the European car industry. She founded the first ever European Car Industry Forum with the EU Commission and participation of all relevant stakeholders i.e. trades unions. It culminated in the Forum on the EU Automobile Industry meeting of 1 March 1994. One of its recommendations led to the establishment of Objective 5 of the European Social Fund designed to assist in the re-training of workers threatened with redundancy. From 1994 to 1999, she was Coordinator for the Socialist Group on Culture, Media, Sport, Education and Youth. She was also spokesperson on public service broadcasting. In this role, in 1995, she established a TV/Film consortium of trades unions and creators' organisations. In 1996, the Parliament adopted her Report on Public Service Broadcasting in the Multichannel Digital Age. This led to the inclusion of a protocol protecting public service broadcasting in the 1997 EU Amsterdam Treaty. In 1997, British Prime Minister Tony Blair appointed her to liaise between the European Parliamentary Labour Party and the UK Department for Culture, Media and Sport. From 1997 to 1999, she was the elected Chair of the European Parliament Cinema and Audiovisual Intergroup.

Post-parliamentary career
Since leaving the European Parliament, she has worked in public affairs advising companies, not-for-profit and public sector organisations, including: universities, charities, NGOs and trades unions. An expert in audiovisual policy, she is currently advising trades unions and rights holders in the creative industries. She is also an external advisor at EUTOP, a German public affairs company, and lectures at universities in London. Tongue has had a long involvement in the arts and creative industries. In 1999, she co-produced The Fleeting Opera on the River Thames with the Couper Collection and the Royal Opera House, Covent Garden. She has an extensive record of public service and campaigning in the areas of audiovisual and cultural diversity of expressions; media plurality; anti-discrimination; equality; diversity; economic democracy; worker participation.

Carole is Chair of the UK Coalition for the Diversity of Cultural Expressions since 2005 when she founded the Coalition with Holy Aylett to implement the 2005 UNESCO Convention on the protection and promotion of the diversity of cultural expressions. She was appointed President of the European Coalitions for Diversity of Cultural Expressions in December 2014. In 2015, she founded and chaired Creatives4Europe, an organisation representing all branches of the creative industries/arts and culture (under the auspices of the European Movement) to campaign for a Remain vote in the 2016 EU membership referendum.

She was a candidate for Change UK in London at the 2019 European Parliament election, being placed third in the list.

Public service appointments
2001–2006: Professional Conduct Committee of the General Medical Council (GMC).

2002–2006: Chair of the London Regional Awards Committee of the Community Fund and Member of the National Board of the Community Fund, distributing money raised by the UK National Lottery for good causes.

2006–2010: Member of the Communications and Information Committee of UNESCO National Commission.

January 2010: Appointed to the Investigation and Registration Committee of the GMC.

Tongue is also: a trustee of Community Service Volunteers; Patron of Engage, the National Association for Gallery Education; Patron of the Federal Trust and Chair of the Independent Film Parliament, Patron of the Arts For All charity. Carole is President of a French charity "Arts a Parts" designed to advance equality through the arts. She is also on the Board of the European Media Initiative campaigning for media plurality.

In 2005, she co-founded and now co-directs the UK Coalition for Cultural Diversity.

In 2014, she was elected Chair of the EU Coalitions for Cultural Diversity.

Academic roles
2001: Visiting Lecturer/Professor in European Audiovisual Policy and British and European Politics at London's University of the Arts

2008: Visiting Lecturer at City University, London, on Cultural Diversity, Arts and Media

Audiovisual policy and strategy
In the 1990s, Tongue campaigned for an EU Protocol to protect public service broadcasting. She also worked for an EU law to defend TV programming reflecting local culture, values and identity. These were enacted despite considerable opposition from certain commercial interests. A protocol defending public service broadcasting was introduced into the 1997 EU Amsterdam Treaty.

During this time, she criticised Rupert Murdoch's influence upon British journalism, media industries and culture. She argued for greater investment in British film, drama and documentary by cable and satellite channels such as BSkyB. She continues to work for cultural diversity of expression and media pluralism.

Tongue advises on audiovisual matters for film production companies. Fluent in French and German, she regularly speaks on broadcasting and film worldwide and is an author of articles and book chapters on European audiovisual policy, public service broadcasting, cultural policy and European affairs. She was a Member of the UNESCO National Committee on Communication and Information from 2002 to 2010.

Honours, awards and memberships
In 2005, Tongue was awarded an honorary doctorate from the University of Lincoln for services to public service in broadcasting and audiovisual sectors.

In June 2022 Carole was awarded the Beaumarchais Medal for services to cultural diversity by the French Society for Dramatic Authors (SACD).

She is a Fellow of the Royal Society for the Encouragement of Arts, Manufactures and Commerce (RSA), a member of the BECTU trade union. She is a Member of BAFTA.

References

1955 births
Living people
Labour Party (UK) MEPs
MEPs for England 1984–1989
MEPs for England 1989–1994
MEPs for England 1994–1999
20th-century women MEPs for England
People from the Borough of Brentwood
Alumni of Loughborough University
Change UK politicians